Paulo Salemi (born 8 August 1993) is a water polo player from Brazil. He was part of the Brazilian team at the 2016 Summer Olympics, where the team was eliminated in the quarterfinals.

References

1993 births
Living people
Sportspeople from Palermo
People with acquired Brazilian citizenship
Brazilian male water polo players
Water polo players at the 2015 Pan American Games
Pan American Games medalists in water polo
Pan American Games silver medalists for Brazil
Olympic water polo players of Brazil
Water polo players at the 2016 Summer Olympics
Medalists at the 2015 Pan American Games
Brazilian people of Italian descent
Sportspeople of Italian descent